Estrela do Norte is municipality in north Goiás state, Brazil.  The population was 3,264 (2020) and the total area was 302.7 km²
  
Estrela do Norte is a municipality surrounded by the following municipalities: 
north:  Mutunópolis and Santa Tereza de Goiás
south:  Mara Rosa
east:  Amaralina
west:  Formoso

The distance to Goiânia is 365 km.  Highway connections are made by GO-080 / Nerópolis / São Francisco de Goiás / BR-153 / Jaraguá / GO-080 / Goianésia / Barro Alto / BR-080 / GO-342 / Uruaçu / Campinorte / GO-241.

The economy is based on cattle raising and agriculture, especially corn, rice, and soybeans.  In 2007 there was one dairy, no banks, and 39 retail units.  There were 205 automobiles.  
Cattle: 22,800 head
In 2006 there were 185 farms with 1,125 hectares planted.  There were 20,000 hectares of pasture.  Approximately 500 persons were employed in farming.  There was modest production of rice, corn, and soybeans.  
Data are from IBGE

The literacy rate was 81.1% (2000) and the infant mortality rate was 16.72 in 1,000 live births.  There were 05 schools with 1,090 students and one hospital with 17 beds.

Estrela do Norte occupies a middle-level position on the Municipal Human Development Index with a score of 0.746, 87 out of 242 municipalities in the state in 2000. 
 
A great defender and a major contributor to the great growth of the region and throughout his life held many jobs for the community of the Estrela do Norte, which made the city be recognized across the state, bringing hitherto political expression as great former Governor Irapuan Costa Júnior, Leonino Caiado, among others, was the former mayor José da Silva, who died in January 1997.

See also
 List of municipalities in Goiás

References

Frigoletto 

Municipalities in Goiás